Cristiano Galvão Parreiro (born 20 August 1979), commonly known as Cristiano, is a Portuguese professional futsal player who plays as a goalkeeper for Futsal Azeméis. He competed at the UEFA Futsal Euro 2014 for the Portugal national team. At club level he started his career playing for Forte da Casa and also played for Sporting CP for over a decade, with shorter stints at Belenenses, SL Olivais and Futsal Azeméis.

References

External links

1979 births
Living people
Futsal goalkeepers
Portuguese men's futsal players
C.F. Os Belenenses futsal players
Sporting CP futsal players